was a Japanese samurai of the early Edo era. The son of Ishida Mitsunari, Shigenari served as a retainer of the Tsugaru clan of Hirosaki.

Samurai
1589 births
1640s deaths